Probainognathia is one of the two major subgroups of the clade Eucynodontia, the other being Cynognathia. The earliest forms were carnivorous and insectivorous, though some groups eventually also evolved herbivorous diets. The earliest and most basal probainognathian is the Middle Triassic (Anisian) aged Lumkuia, from South Africa, though probainognathians would not become prominent until the mid Norian stage of the Late Triassic. Three groups survived the extinction at the end of Triassic: Tritheledontidae and Tritylodontidae, which both survived until the Jurassic—the latter even into the Cretaceous (Montirictus and Xenocretosuchus)—and Mammaliaformes, which includes the mammals.

Phylogeny

Below is a cladogram from Ruta, Botha-Brink, Mitchell and Benton (2013) showing one hypothesis of cynodont relationships:

See also
 Evolution of mammals
 List of prehistoric mammals

References

 
Extant Middle Triassic first appearances
Taxa named by James Hopson